The Buraco das Araras Private Natural Heritage Reserve is a privately operated conservation area in the state of Mato Grosso do Sul, Brazil. It takes its name from the Buraco das Araras (Hole of Macaws), a large sinkhole that is the main feature of the reserve.

Location
The hole would have been known to the original inhabitants of the area.
It was rediscovered in 1912 by a local worker, and named the Buraco das Araras (Macaw Hole) after the many macaws flying around it.
According to local legend the hole was used over the years as a place to dispose of cattle thieves and others whom the local ranchers or politicians wanted to eliminate.
The sinkhole was vandalized, with the walls and macaws used as targets for guns, and rubbish thrown into the hole including stolen cars.

Reserve
The privately-owned reserve was created on 11 April 2007.
It is classed as IUCN protected area category IV (habitat/species management area).
There is a vivid green lagoon at the bottom of the sinkhole surrounded by thriving vegetation.
The hole is occupied by caimans, armadillos, anteaters, coatis, foxes, the macaws for which it is named, ibises, toucans and many other species of birds.
The owner manages the reserve and is responsible for compliance with the legal requirements for a private natural heritage reserve.
Visitors are accompanied in groups of no more than ten people by a tour guide or local environmental monitor on a walk around the sinkhole.

References

Sources

2007 establishments in Brazil
Protected areas of Mato Grosso do Sul
Private natural heritage reserves of Brazil